Aliya Boshnak (born 19 December 2000) is a Jordanian athlete. She competed in the women's 400 metres event at the 2020 Summer Olympics.

References

External links
 Yale Bulldogs bio
 

2000 births
Living people
Jordanian female sprinters
Athletes (track and field) at the 2020 Summer Olympics
Olympic athletes of Jordan
Place of birth missing (living people)
Yale Bulldogs women's track and field athletes
Olympic female sprinters
21st-century Jordanian women